Franz Josef Bach (2 February 1917 – 8 August 2001) was a German politician of the Christian Democratic Union (CDU) and former member of the German Bundestag.

Life 
Bach, who was a member of the CDU, was a member of the German Bundestag from 1969 to 1972. He represented the constituency of Aachen-Stadt in parliament.

Literature

References

1917 births
2001 deaths
Members of the Bundestag for North Rhine-Westphalia
Members of the Bundestag 1969–1972
Members of the Bundestag for the Christian Democratic Union of Germany
Consuls in Hong Kong